D.R. Bendre Cricket Stadium is a cricket stadium in the city of Hubli. The stadium was constructed in 2012 and serves as second home to Karnataka Cricket Team. The stadium is built according to international standards, with the seating capacity of 50,000. The stadium was inaugurated by the former Chief Minister of Karnataka Jagadish Shettar in November 2012. The Ground is named after a great Kannada Poet and Jnanpith Award Winner Mr. D.R. Bendre.

The stadium hosted third unofficial test match between India A cricket team and West Indies A cricket team in which player like Gautam Gambhhir, Zaheer Khan, Cheteshwar Pujara played as India A won by innings and 51 runs. The match also saw triple century by  Cheteshwar Pujara.

The stadium is the home ground for Karnataka Premier League team Hubli Tigers.

See also 

 M Chinnaswamy Stadium
 Hubli Tigers
 Karnataka State Cricket Association
 Shamanur Davangere Diamonds

References

External links 
 cricketarchive
 cricinfo

Buildings and structures in Hubli-Dharwad
Cricket grounds in Karnataka
Sports venues completed in 2012
2012 establishments in Karnataka